The Christian People's Party is a minor political party in the Dominican Republic. It first contested national elections in 1986, when it was part of the Dominican Revolutionary Party-led alliance which lost to the Social Christian Reformist Party coalition. In the 1990 elections it formed an alliance with MIM, but received only 0.4% of the national vote and failed to win a seat. The party did not contest the 1994 elections, but was again part of a Dominican Revolutionary Party-led alliance in the 1998 elections. However, it switched its allegiance to the Social Christian Reformist Party for the 2002 elections. It had a candidate in the 2004 presidential elections, but they received less than 0.5% of the vote. In the 2006 elections it was part of the defeated Grand National Alliance. The party did not contest the 2010 elections.

References

Christian political parties
Political parties in the Dominican Republic